Norman Ewart Ker Pender (1 February 1948 – 24 August 2021) was a Scotland international rugby union player. After rugby, he became a Liberal Democrat councillor. He was found guilty of sexual assault in 2014. He died from a suspected heart attack in August 2021, at the age of 73.

Rugby Union career

Amateur career
Pender played club rugby for Hawick Trades and then Hawick.

Provincial career
Pender was capped by South of Scotland District.

International career
Pender was capped for Scotland 'B' 3 times between 1975-77.

He earned four caps for Scotland.

Political career
Pender was a councillor for the Liberal Democrats on the Scottish Borders Council between 1998 and 2003.

Indecent behaviour
Pender was charged with rape in October 2013, and was found guilty of three charges of lewd and libidinous behavior, and one charge of sexual assault in December 2013. The rape charge was not proven.

He was jailed for six years in 2014 and placed on the sex offenders’ register.

In 2018 he was sued for £650,000 in damages by one of the victims.

References

1948 births
2021 deaths
Rugby union players from Yorkshire
Scottish rugby union players
Scotland international rugby union players
Hawick RFC players
Hawick Trades players
Scotland 'B' international rugby union players
South of Scotland District (rugby union) players
Rugby union props